John Alderson may refer to:
John Alderson (physician) (1758–1829), English physician
John D. Alderson (1854–1910), United States Representative from West Virginia
Jack Alderson (1891–1972), English footballer
John Alderson (footballer) (fl. 1930–1932), English footballer
John Alderson (actor) (1916–2006), English-born Hollywood actor
John Alderson (police officer) (1922–2011), British police officer, Chief Constable of Devon and Cornwall, 1973–1982
John Alderson (cricketer) (born 1929), New Zealand cricketer

See also
Alderson (disambiguation)